|}

The EFT Construction Handicap Hurdle is a Grade 3 National Hunt hurdle race in Great Britain which is open to horses aged four years or older. It is run at Aintree over a distance of about 3 miles and ½ furlong (3 miles and 149 yards, or 4,964 metres), and during its running there are thirteen hurdles to be jumped. It is a handicap race, and it is scheduled to take place each year in early April at the Grand National meeting. 

The race was promoted from Listed to Grade 3 status in 2010. In 2014 the race was run as the Dominican Republic Handicap Hurdle and in 2015 it carried the name of the Injured Jockeys Fund. From 2016 to 2019 it was sponsored by Gaskells and since 2021 the sponsors have been EFT Systems.

The race was first run in 1985 as the Oddbins Handicap Hurdle, but this name was switched to the 2 miles 4 furlong race (now known as the Merseyrail Handicap Hurdle) in 1992.

Winners
 Weights given in stones and pounds.

See also
 Horse racing in Great Britain
 List of British National Hunt races

References

Racing Post

Timeform
2002

National Hunt races in Great Britain
Aintree Racecourse
National Hunt hurdle races